Walter Duncan (1848-1932) was a British painter and watercolorist.

Biography 

He was born in London in 1848 to the artist Edward Duncan and Berthia née Huggins, the daughter of British marine painter William John Huggins. He studied art at the British Museum and the Heatherley School of Fine Art and served a seven-year apprenticeship at the Royal Academy of Arts. In 1874, he was elected an Associate of the Royal Watercolour Society. Proud of this distinction, he sometimes appended "A.R.W.S." to his name when he signed his works.

In 1871, he married Harriet Charlotte Florence Pigott née Condy (1846-1880), the daughter of the painter Nicholas Matthews Condy. After her death, he remarried the daughter of an officer stationed in the North-Western Provinces. This led to a two-year stay in India.

He died in 1932 in Richmond, London.

Works in museums 
 Heathland Landscape in the A la Ronde, Devon.
 Fanciulla  nel bosco (1898) and Venditrice di fiori a St. Martin in the Fields (1919) in the Museo d'arte, Avellino.
 The First Interview between Elizabeth Woodville and King Edward IV (1902) in the Royal Collection, London.
 Various landscapes in the Craven Museum & Gallery, Skipton, North Yorkshire.

References

Bibliography 
WRIGIT Christopher, GORDON Catherine Mary, SMITH Mary Peskett (2006),  “Walter Duncan”, in IDEM British and Irish Paintings in Public Collections, New Haven 2006, Yale University Press, p. 310.

External links 
 Photo gallery at artnet.com
 

1848 births
1932 deaths
People from the London Borough of Camden
19th-century English painters
English male painters
20th-century English painters
Painters from London
20th-century English male artists
19th-century English male artists